Emilio Picariello (also known as Emileo Picariello and Emil Picariello, 1875 or 1879 – May 2, 1923) was an Italian-Canadian bootlegger and convicted murderer, who was hanged at Fort Saskatchewan in 1923 for killing an Alberta Provincial Police constable the previous year.

Early life
Picariello was born in Capriglia Irpina and immigrated to the United States in 1899. He moved to Toronto, Ontario, Canada in 1902, where he worked as an electrician and labourer until he had earned enough money to buy an Italian grocery. In 1900 he married Maria Marucci, who he had met at a boarding house where she worked as a housekeeper; the couple went on to have seven children, the eldest of whom was Stefano "Steve" Picariello. In 1911 he moved to Fernie, British Columbia, where he worked in G. Maraniro's macaroni factory. When Maraniro moved to Lethbridge to open a factory there, Picariello rented the Fernie factory and hired women to roll cigars in it.

He sold this from a wagon during the summer of 1916 and shortly thereafter established ice cream parlours in Trail and Blairmore. He sometimes accepted payment in the form of bottles, which he then sold to bottlers; by 1916 he had achieved a local monopoly. This gained him a reputation as the "Bottle King", which he embraced with newspaper ads reading "E. Picariello, the Bottle King, requests that all persons selling bottles hold them until they see E. Picariello, who pays top prices."

Bootlegger
In 1914, he became the local representative for the Pillock Wine Company.  Two years later, prohibition was enacted in Alberta.  It was initially still legal to import alcohol from outside the province, and Picarellio profited by transporting alcohol through the Crowsnest Pass. 

In 1917, British Columbia also introduced prohibition, and Picariello decided to move to Alberta to be closer to Montana, which allowed the sale of alcohol, while remaining close to the British Columbia distilleries from which he purchased.  He bought Blairmore's Alberta Hotel as a base of operations.  In 1918 Alberta outlawed the importation of alcohol and Picariello was forced to operate covertly.  He excavated a room under the hotel and dug a tunnel from it out to the road, so that alcohol could be smuggled directly into this cellar.  He had a player piano in the hotel lounge, whose noise drowned out these activities.

The Alberta Provincial Police (APP) set up checkpoints in the Crowsnest Pass, but Picariello adopted a number of tactics to foil them. Sometimes he would load his cars—Ford Model Ts, initially, replaced in 1918 by three McLaughlins, a number which grew to six by 1922—with sacks of what appeared to be flour. The sacks on the outside of the car, most susceptible to being searched, actually contained flour, but buried beneath them would be sacks containing bottles of alcohol. Another tactic was to send two cars at once, the first empty and the second transporting alcohol; if a checkpoint stopped the first car, the second would quietly retreat. His automobiles came to be known as the "Whiskey Special" cars.

Picariello became a wealthy and respected citizen. He was known locally as the "Emperor Pic" while the Alberta Hotel in Blairmore was known as his "castle". He was elected alderman of Blairmore, and was praised for his philanthropy (among other things, the sacks of decoy flour were distributed to needy families).  During World War I, he bought $5,000 worth of victory bonds. While coal miners in the area were on strike in 1918, he contributed money to their families.  This respect came even though it was widely known that he was a bootlegger: in 1921 he was fined $20 after the APP found four barrels of alcohol in his warehouse. In January 1922, the APP recovered 70 barrels of beer from a railway car with a bill of lading in Picariello's name; his claim that the beer had been erroneously sent in response to his order for carbonated water did not convince the judge, who fined him $500.

Carlo Sanfidele worked for Picariello as a chauffeur and hotel manager for Picariello. Sanfidele and his wife Florence Lassandro also worked with Picariello in his bootlegging operations. Lassandro was also Picariello's mistress.

Murder and hanging
Picariello's son, Steve Picariello, became involved in a police chase on September 21, 1922, during which he was shot in the hand by Constable Stephen O. Lawson of the Alberta Provincial Police. Picariello had assumed that his son had been killed when he heard a rumour that he had been shot and went to confront Lawson. In Coleman, Picariello and Lassandro confronted Constable Lawson, who was fatally shot in front of his home by the pair.

Both Picariello and Lassandro were arrested the following day, and were convicted for Lawson's murder; however, the trial was a questionable affair of who actually shot Lawson. Nevertheless, both were sentenced to hanging on December 2, 1922; they unsuccessfully sought clemency from the courts, the Justice Minister, and the Prime Minister. Lassandro and Picariello were hanged on the gallows of Fort Saskatchewan penitentiary on May 2, 1923. Picariello was popular in Alberta, and public opinion was on the side of Picariello and Lassandro on the day of their executions with many feeling that the death sentences handed down by the court to be excessively harsh in view of the mitigating circumstances. The executions of Picariello and Lassandro are credited with helping to turn public opinion against Prohibition in Alberta.

References

Further reading

1870s births
1923 deaths
Bootleggers
Canadian people convicted of murder
Italian people convicted of murder
Canadian grocers
Prohibition-era gangsters
Italian emigrants to Canada
People executed by Canada by hanging
Executed Canadian people
People from the Regional District of East Kootenay
People from Fort Saskatchewan
Canadian people convicted of murdering police officers
Italian people convicted of murdering police officers
Canadian gangsters of Italian descent
People executed for murdering police officers
Italian people executed abroad
Alberta municipal councillors